The 2008 Greek Cup Final was the 64th final of the Greek Cup. The match took place on 17 May 2008 at Kaftanzoglio Stadium. The contesting teams were Olympiacos and Aris. It was Olympiacos' thirty third Greek Cup Final in their 83 years of existence and Aris' eighth Greek Cup Final in their 94-year history. It was the last match of the referee, Giorgos Kasnaferis before his retirement, as he whistled in 4 of the last 8 cup finals.

Venue

This was the second Greek Cup Final held at the Kaftanzoglio Stadium, after the 1970 final.

The Kaftanzoglio Stadium was built in 1960 and renovated once in 2004. The stadium is used as a venue for Iraklis and was used for Greece in 1969. Its current capacity is 27,770 and hosted a UEFA Cup Winners' Cup Final in 1983.

Background
Olympiacos qualified for the Greek Cup Final thirty two times, winning twenty two of them. They last played in a Final in 2006, when they had won AEK Athens, 3–0.

Aris qualified for the Greek Cup Final seven times, winning one of them. They last won the Cup in 1970 (1–0 against PAOK). They last qualified for a Final in 2005, when they lost to Olympiacos, 3–0.

Route to the final

Match

Details

See also
2007–08 Greek Football Cup

References

2008
Cup Final
Greek Cup Final 2008
Greek Cup Final 2008
Sports competitions in Thessaloniki
May 2008 sports events in Europe